Tómas Leifsson (born 20 January 1953) is an Icelandic alpine skier. He competed in two events at the 1976 Winter Olympics.

References

1953 births
Living people
Tómas Leifsson
Tómas Leifsson
Alpine skiers at the 1976 Winter Olympics
Tómas Leifsson
20th-century Icelandic people